Ravenea hildebrandtii is a species of palm tree. It is endemic to the Comoros. It is threatened by habitat loss.

References

hildebrandtii
Endemic flora of the Comoros
Endangered flora of Africa
Taxonomy articles created by Polbot